José Gregorio Esparza (February 25, 1802 – March 6, 1836), also known as Gregorio Esparza, was the last Texan defender to enter the Alamo during the early days of March 1836 in the Siege of the Alamo and was the only one that was not burned in the pyres. He had brought his family into the Alamo compound along with him. They were able to survive the battle and were not executed by the conquering army.

Early life and family
He was born on February 25, 1802, in San Antonio de Béxar, the child of Juan Antonio and Maria Petra (Olivas) Esparza. He married Ana (Anna) Salazar, they had a daughter and three sons. His family was also in the Alamo during the siege and were eventually freed after it.

Texas Revolution
Esparza joined the volunteer Texan Army. He traveled to La Bahia and joined with the forces gathered by Plácido Benavides who participated in the Battle of Goliad #1 and would align with James Bowie while he was at Goliad. The company then proceeded to San Antonio where they joined up under Juan Seguín's command in October 1835. There he participated on December 5 through 9 in the house to house fighting, taking the plazas on the north side of Béxar. He served up through December 10, when General Martín Perfecto de Cos surrendered.

General Antonio López de Santa Anna was fast approaching San Antonio. John W. Smith had suggested that Esparza should gather Ana with the family and move to Nacogdoches, but time ran short and on the evening of February 23, he with his family entered at night through a window in the Alamo compound. He was an avid supporter of James Bowie and would not leave the Alamo when given the chance during an armistice, probably due to this relationship. In the Alamo he commanded artillery at the rear of the Chapel, where he died on March 6, 1836.  His Brother, Francisco, although a soldier in Santa Anna's army, did not participate in the battle but requested to locate his brother and was allowed to search through the bodies in the Alamo. He found the body shot and stabbed in the Alamo Chapel. His body was the only one of the defenders allowed to receive a Christian burial. He was buried by his brothers in the Campo Santo cemetery in San Antonio.

Esparza survivors of the Battle of the Alamo
His family members were spared and are listed as official non-combatant survivors of the Battle of the Alamo. María de Jesús Castro also known as María de Jesús Esparza was the young step daughter of Esparza, who was also spared after the battle. His wife, Ana Esparza died in 1847, and the family was left without parents. Between 1850 and 1860, Gregorio's sons, Enrique, Manuel and Francisco filed pension petitions to gain the rights to land at Pleasanton, Texas.  Enrique, a San Antonio truck-farmer, also in the Alamo during the siege, was rediscovered in 1901 and became a recorded eyewitness of what transpired during the siege. His brother, Manuel owned a general store in Pleasanton, and later served in the Confederate Army during the Civil War. Francisco would also serve in the Confederate Army and later became a Texas Ranger. He eventually moved to Tucson, Arizona, and became a law officer in the area.

See also
List of Texan survivors of the Battle of the Alamo

Tejanos who served under Juan Seguín

Citations
Citations

References 

 

 

1802 births
1836 deaths
People of Spanish Texas
Alamo defenders
Military personnel from San Antonio